Rune Factory 2: A Fantasy Harvest Moon is a simulation role-playing video game developed by Neverland. It was published in Japan, North America and the PAL regions by Marvelous Entertainment, Natsume and Rising Star Games respectively for the Nintendo DS.

Gameplay

Rune Factory 2: A Fantasy Harvest Moon has gameplay similar to its predecessor. The game runs on its own clock and calendar; while the player is outside, one in-game minute passes every second. All four seasons are included, though there are only 120 days in the year, with 30 days per season. The weather varies from day to day - while it is typically sunny, there are occasional rainy days, and, rarely, storms might damage crops and force the player to stay indoors.

The player begins with two tools, the hoe and the watering can, allowing the player to till the land and grow various plants after the player purchases or obtains seeds. Each type of seed has a different growth rate and cost, and some plants can be harvested multiple times. In the beginning of the game, the player is given a farm littered with rocks, stumps, and various objects littered throughout. Once the seeds are sown, the player must water them daily, and after several days of growing, they will be able to be picked and either sold, given away, eaten, or stored. For the most part, each plant may only be planted in one particular season, and if, for example, a spring plant is in the ground during summer, it will die. Plants can be grown in certain areas outside the farm, where the climate is unchanging; however, these areas must be watered by the player, and usually contain enemies.

The player interacts with objects and townsfolk through dialogue similar to a visual novel, including representing the townfolk with anime-styled images to narrate the story. In addition, cut scenes occur at certain points in the storyline. While every NPC has "Friend Points" that can be increased by visiting them and giving them items, seven female characters also have a statistic called "Love Points" that increases as the player shows them affection. When the Love Point total reaches ten, the player can then marry the character and raise a child, who becomes the second protagonist. The child is unable to marry, but can conduct a "love ceremony" instead.

The player character has two types of statistics: ability statistics and battle statistics. The former show how well the player can execute a certain task, while the latter are standard role-playing game statistics. These battle statistics can be improved either by defeating enough enemies to level up or by equipping a particular weapon or piece of equipment. The player's skills include basic tasks such as farming, fighting, and mining, and they level up as the player carries out these tasks. A specific tool is usually required for every task; some tools can also be used as weapons.

While exploring, the player can fight monsters to increase their strength, or befriend them and keep them as livestock, farmhands, or as battling companions. Items harvested from livestock kept in barns can be sold for money or used to cook.

Plot

Setting
The game has several different areas. The main area is the player's farm, where they do most of their farming and living in. The player's house has the basic amenities, including a refrigerator, a bed, a table, and others. The player has a diary that they can use to save their progress, and a mailbox from which the player may occasionally receive mail. Just south of the farm is the seaside town of Alvarna, which has a variety of locations, including shops, houses, and other facilities. There are several monster-infested dungeons throughout the game, each based in one of the seasons. The player can find land fit to farm with, as well as monsters that can be fought or captured.

Rune Factory 2 features festivals on specific days of the year. Most of the festivals are original ones from Harvest Moon/Story of Seasons and Rune Factory, though some are based on real-world festivals, such as New Year's Eve. Stores are not open on holidays, with the exception of the bathhouse, which is closed on Mondays.

Story
A boy with amnesia wanders to a town named Alvarna. He meets a girl named Mana who gives him a farmland and tools to use and names himself "Kyle" (which can be changed). Upon developing his life with a new identity, he is married to a chosen bride and conceives a child with her; a son or daughter depending on the player's choice named "Aaron" or "Aria" respectively (which, again, can be changed). Later he helps build a school for the town. One day, he regains his memory and remembers why he came to Alvarna, and why he felt so strongly to build the school. He then leaves his family in the middle of the night. A few years later, his child following clues left behind by the father, learns about the existence of Fiersome, a dragon who was sealed 1000 years ago. The child also discovers the father left so he could merge himself to Fiersome to restrain the dragon's powers. The child defeats and seals the dragon away with the spell Dragon Break. Upon doing so, the father's spirit is sealed along with the dragon's. The child continues to find a way to separate the father's spirit from Fiersome back home and finds the spell Omni-Gate which manages to bring the father back home and reunites him with the family and friends he left behind.

Development
According to Marvelous's managing director and Harvest Moon/Story of Seasons's creator, Yasuhiro Wada, Rune Factory 2 does not borrow the Harvest Moon(Bokujō Monogatari) name for the Japanese release. This was done in order to grow Rune Factory as an independent series and Marvelous will continue to do this with all future installments including Rune Factory Frontier. Despite this, Natsume applied the subtitle A Fantasy Harvest Moon to Rune Factory 2.

The American pre-order bonus was a plush squirrel that was included in the box when ordered from participating websites.

Related media

Manga
Rune Factory 2 has had multiple manga series to help promote the game, in such magazines as Dengeki Nintendo DS, Monthly Wings, Dragon Age, and Dengeki Maoh. If players pre-ordered the game in Japan, they would receive a free CD with three mini-dramas as well as an 18-page art book.

Music
Sometime after the release of the game in Japan, a CD with all the background music, three mini-dramas, and the two theme songs was released with a novel based on the game following sometime after.

Reception

Rune Factory 2 received "generally favorable reviews" according to the review aggregation website Metacritic. IGN said that "this sequel is not very far removed from its predecessor at all... that doesn't make it a bad game."

Notes

References

External links

Official website

Role-playing video games
Action role-playing video games
Marvelous Entertainment
Neverland (company) games
Nintendo DS games
Nintendo DS-only games
Nintendo Wi-Fi Connection games
Rune Factory
Simulation video games
Video games developed in Japan
Video games featuring protagonists of selectable gender
2008 video games
Rising Star Games games
Single-player video games
Natsume (company) games